Fast Food is a 1998 British film starring Gerard Butler and written and directed by Stewart Sugg.

Plot
Benny returns to the town of his youth to find the girl he's loved since childhood and runs into his four old criminal friends who have plans to rob a local gangster.

References

External links

1998 films
British independent films
1998 crime films
British crime films
1998 independent films
1990s English-language films
1990s British films